Młynek  is a village in the administrative district of Gmina Brody, within Starachowice County, Świętokrzyskie Voivodeship, in south-central Poland.

The village has a population of 915.

There is a dam close to the Młynek. Many people from Młynek fish there.

Several cranes, beavers and deer can be seen in the village.

References

Villages in Starachowice County